George Edwin Anderson (June 30, 1891 – March 6, 1961) was an American businessman and politician.

Anderson was born in Minneapolis, Minnesota. He lived in Onamia, Mille Lacs County, Minnesota with his wife. He owned a summer resort business. Anderson served on the South Harbor Township Board and on the Mille Lac School Board. Edwin served in the Minnesota House of Representatives from 1939 to 1942.

References

1891 births
1961 deaths
People from Mille Lacs County, Minnesota
Businesspeople from Minnesota
Politicians from Minneapolis
School board members in Minnesota
Members of the Minnesota House of Representatives